Count Andor Festetics de Tolna (17 January 1843 – 16 August 1930) was a Hungarian politician, who served as Minister of Agriculture between 1894 and 1895. He was married to Lenke Pejacsevich de Verőcze. One of his three sons was Sándor Festetics, Minister of War who later became an advocate of Nazism in Hungary.

His first son was Gustavus Alexander Festetics de Tolna (11 March 1873 – 8 August 1905), who married Elsa Goldfinger.

References
 Magyar Életrajzi Lexikon	

1843 births
1930 deaths
People from Pest, Hungary
Agriculture ministers of Hungary
Andor